Baseball is the most popular sport in the Dominican Republic. It is a major sport in the country, and was introduced in the late-19th century in the city of San Pedro de Macorís by Cuban immigrants. After the United States, the Dominican Republic has the second-highest number of baseball players in Major League Baseball (MLB). The Dominican Republic national baseball team has won the Baseball World Cup in 1948 and the World Baseball Classic in 2013.

History 

During the 1870s, many Cuban citizens fled Cuba because of the Ten Years' War. Many relocated to the Dominican Republic, bringing with them the sport of baseball. The nation's expert class was established in 1890. The first clubs were Ozama and Nuevo. On 7 November 1907, the Licey club was established in Santo Domingo. By the 1930s, it had developed into a major source for gifted players whose guardians frequently worked at sugar refineries. In 1937, Negro league stars from the United States including Satchel Paige came to the country. In the mid-1950s Rafael Trujillo built the main stadium. Dominican players initially began migrating to the U.S. to play for Major League Baseball, starting with utility infielder Ozzie Virgil.

Cultural impact 
Not only did baseball help strengthen the Dominican Republic's relationship with the United States, but it also had a massive effect on the culture of the Dominican Republic as a whole. Nowadays, baseball symbolizes a dream and hope for a better future for aspiring athletes and helps unite baseball fans (old and new) across several Spanish-speaking countries. The rise of baseball in the Dominican Republic has also had a massive impact on the economy of the country as a whole, generating around $1 billion per year via training facilities and professional games.

1951–present
A summer baseball league began in 1951. In the 1955–56 season, it joined the professional association. Since then, the league has attracted many top players from the major leagues. Beginning in the 1955 season, the country's international presence grew attracting global attention. As of 2015 opening day, Dominicans were 83 of Major League Baseball's 868 players. At the beginning of the 2016 season, no country other than the United States contributed as many.

The Dominican Republic's Professional Baseball League  LIDOM by its acronym in Spanish, hosts yearly winter games across the country. It consists of 6 teams, and it is the highest level of professional baseball played in the Dominican Republic.

Championships 
Every year at the end of the summer season, the two tops teams from that season face off at La Normal Stadium. This has been a major cultural event in the Dominican Republic, drawing in thousands of eager fans. Find more information on the winners of these playoff games in the table below:

Titles By Team

Baseball academies

Baseball academies are how Major League Baseball recruiters develop the talent they find across all Latin America. In 1987, the Los Angeles Dodgers were the first MLB club to establish a baseball academy in the Dominican Republic when they opened the doors to Campo Las Palmas. Now, every single one of the teams in the MLB has a baseball academy in the Dominican Republic.

With four out of every ten Dominicans living in poverty, baseball has become a small beacon of hope for many Dominican families. The baseball academies in the Dominican Republic offer many young boys what may be their and their family's only chance of overcoming poverty, and as a result many boys as young as age 10 drop out of school to focus all of their attention on baseball and someday playing for an MLB team. However, it is estimated that only two percent of Dominican recruits are actually able to make a living playing in MLB, leaving many of these young recruits finding themselves aged 19–21 with no education, no work skills, and no job prospects. Joe Kehoskie, a former baseball agent, described the situation in the 2001 PBS documentary, Stealing Home:

Because of this, many baseball academies in the country have made efforts to incorporate educational programs that teach English and financial skills to their recruits, to better prepare them for the future. For instance, the Arizona Diamondbacks' baseball academy, ran by former major league player Junior Noboa, is committed to helping their players complete at least their high school education, even if they are released from their team.

Notables
The list of notable names continues to grow each year and includes some major history-making players including: Juan Marichal, Felipe Alou, Bartolo Colón, Tony Fernandez and others. Some more recent and recognizable, Major League Baseball names include:

Pedro Martínez

Pedro Martínez, from Manoguayabo, was a Major League Baseball player from 1992 to 2009. He played for five teams and was best known for his tenure with the Boston Red Sox, joining with Ortiz to help them win the World Series in 2004. From 2002 to 2006, Martínez held the league record for the highest career winning percentage by a pitcher. He won three Cy Young Awards and was the first Latin American pitcher to achieve at least 300 strikeouts in a season and 3,000 in a career. Martínez reached the 3,000 strikeout mark in fewer pitches than any pitcher other than Randy Johnson. Martínez was the only pitcher to acquire 3,000 strikeouts with fewer than 3,000 innings pitched.

Martínez became a U.S. citizen in April 2006.  He was elected to the Hall of Fame in 2015.

Sammy Sosa

Sammy Sosa was born on 12 November 1968 in San Pedro de Macorís. Sosa was a slugger and had his best years while he played for the Chicago Cubs. Sosa influenced many Dominicans and is best known for his record-breaking season in which he hit 61 home runs.

David Ortiz

David Ortiz arrived in MLB in 1997, experiencing injuries that slowed his progress. Ortiz signed with the Boston Red Sox in 2003 but did not play much until he became their designated hitter later that year. In 2004, Ortiz became known globally for his achievements. During the 2004 season, he hit 41 home runs and had 139 RBIs while batting .301. He joined with Martinez to lead the Boston Red Sox to their first World Series Championship in 86 years.

Robinson Canó

Robinson Canó is a professional second baseman baseball player, born on 22 October 1982 in San Pedro de Macorís. At a young age, Canó knew he wanted to become a baseball player. He was first signed by the New York Yankees as a free agent in 2001, at the age of 18. Since then, Canó has played with the Seattle Mariners and on 3 December 2018, was traded to the New York Mets on a five-year contract.

Most Valuable Player

See also

Sport in the Dominican Republic
Dominican Republic national baseball team
List of Major League Baseball players from the Dominican Republic

References

External links
 Republic of Baseball: The Dominican Giants of the American Game Latino Public Broadcasting Documentary